Pak Ok-Song (also Pak Ok-Seong, ; born October 16, 1984) is a North Korean judoka, who played for the extra-lightweight category. She won two medals, silver and bronze, for the 48 kg division at the Asian Judo Championships (2007 in Kuwait City, Kuwait, and 2008 in Jeju City, South Korea).

Pak represented North Korea at the 2008 Summer Olympics in Beijing, where she competed for the women's extra-lightweight class (48 kg). She defeated Portugal's Ana Hormigo and Kazakhstan's Kelbet Nurgazina in the preliminary rounds, before losing out the semi-final match, by an ippon (full point) and a yoko shiho gatame (side four quarter hold), to Cuba's Yanet Bermoy. Because Bermoy advanced further into the final match against Romania's Alina Dumitru, Pak automatically qualified for the bronze medal game, where she narrowly lost the medal to Argentina's Paula Pareto, who successfully scored a waza-ari (half-point) and a kuchiki taoshi (single leg takedown), at the end of the five-minute period.

References

External links

NBC Olympics Profile

North Korean female judoka
Living people
Olympic judoka of North Korea
Judoka at the 2008 Summer Olympics
1984 births
21st-century North Korean women